This article attempts to list of the highest falls survived without a parachute. Some heights are difficult to verify due to lack of documentation and are approximated

List of the highest falls survived without a parachute

References

Fall survivors
Falling
Highest things